San Diego Sunwaves were an American women's soccer team, founded in 2005, which played in the USL W-League for three years, until 2007, when they left the league and the franchise was terminated.

Prior to the 2007 season the team was known as the San Diego Gauchos Women, and was associated with the now-defunct men's USL Premier Development League franchise, the San Diego Gauchos.

The Sunwaves played their home games at Torero Stadium on the grounds of the University of San Diego in the city of San Diego, California. The team's colors were blue, red and white.

Final Squad
vs Seattle Sounders Women, 27 July 2007

Year-by-year

Honors
 USL W-League Western Conference Champions 2007

Competition history

Coaches
  Daniel Sinohui, Charlie Cleaves 2005-06
  Elio Bello 2007

General Manager
Charlie Cleaves 2006

Stadia
 Stadium at Sweetwater High School, National City, California 2005
 Stadium at Steele Canyon High School, Spring Valley, California 2005 (1 game)
 Torero Stadium, San Diego, California 2006-07
 Stadium at Southwestern College, Chula Vista, California 2006-07 (2 games)
 Balboa Stadium, San Diego, California 2006 (2 games)
 Stadium at Otay Ranch High School, Chula Vista, California 2006 (1 game)

Average attendance

External links
Page at USL Soccer

 
Women's soccer clubs in the United States
Defunct soccer clubs in California
Defunct USL W-League (1995–2015) teams
2005 establishments in California
2007 disestablishments in California
Association football clubs established in 2005
Association football clubs disestablished in 2007
Women's sports in California